The Peak is a twin tower luxury apartment complex located at Setiabudi, within the Golden Triangle CBD in Jakarta. It was designed by DP Architects and comprises four towers. Towers 1 and 2 have 55 storeys and a height of 218.5 m,. while Towers 3 and 4 have 35 storeys. In 2006, the year The Peak was opened, it was featured by Images Publishing Australia in its book 50 of the World's Best Apartments. Davy Sukamta & Partners - Structural Engineers, Indonesia, were the structural design engineers for the project.

See also

 List of tallest residential buildings in the world
List of tallest buildings in Jakarta

References

External links

Buildings and structures in Jakarta
Shopping malls in Jakarta
Twin towers
Residential skyscrapers in Indonesia
South Jakarta